Serquigny is a commune of the Eure department in Normandy in northern France.

It lies on the rail line from Cherbourg to Paris. In the village there is a privately owned manor house called Chateau de Maubuisson.

Population

Démographie

See also
Communes of the Eure department

References

Communes of Eure